Pfaffenhofen is the name of several places in Europe:

In Germany:
 Pfaffenhofen an der Ilm, a town in Bavaria
 Pfaffenhofen (district), in Bavaria
 Pfaffenhofen an der Glonn, a municipality in Dachau, Bavaria
 a part of the municipality of Altomünster in Dachau, Bavaria
 Pfaffenhofen an der Roth, a municipality in Neu-Ulm, Bavaria
 Pfaffenhofen, Baden-Württemberg, a municipality in Heilbronn, Baden-Württemberg

In Austria:
 Pfaffenhofen, Tyrol, a municipality in Innsbruck-Land, Tyrol

See also
 Pfaffenhoffen in Alsacia, France